Helge Meuller (15 March 1909 – 22 April 1988) was a Swedish sports shooter. He competed in two events at the 1936 Summer Olympics.

References

External links
 

1909 births
1988 deaths
Swedish male sport shooters
Olympic shooters of Sweden
Shooters at the 1936 Summer Olympics
Sportspeople from Södermanland County